The 2018 Busan Open was a professional tennis tournament played on hard courts. It was the seventeenth edition of the tournament which was part of the 2018 ATP Challenger Tour. It took place in Busan, South Korea between 14 and 20 May 2018.

Singles main-draw entrants

Seeds
* 1 Rankings as of May 7, 2018.

Other entrants
The following players received wildcards into the singles main draw:
  Hong Seong-chan
  Kim Young-seok
  Na Jung-woong
  Oh Chan-yeong

The following player received entry into the singles main draw as a special exempt:
  Yoshihito Nishioka

The following players received entry from the qualifying draw:
  Maverick Banes
  Chung Yun-seong
  Rubin Statham
  Yosuke Watanuki

Champions

Singles

 Matthew Ebden def.  Vasek Pospisil 7–6(7–4), 6–1.

Doubles

 Hsieh Cheng-peng /  Christopher Rungkat def.  Ruan Roelofse /  John-Patrick Smith 6–4, 6–3.

External links
Official Website

2018 ATP Challenger Tour
2018
May 2018 sports events in South Korea
2018 in South Korean tennis